The 2018 Tunisian protests were a series of protests occurring throughout Tunisia. Beginning January 2018, protests erupted in multiple towns and cities across Tunisia over issues related to the cost of living and taxes. As of January 9, the demonstrations had claimed at least one life, and revived worries about the fragile political situation in Tunisia.

The Popular Front, an alliance of leftist opposition parties, called for continued protests against the government's "unjust" austerity measures while Tunisian Prime Minister Youssef Chahed denounced the violence and appealed for calm, claiming that he and his government believe 2018 "would be the last difficult year for Tunisians".

Background
After the 2011 Revolution, Tunisia was widely seen as the only democratic success story in the Arab Spring, a model "for democratic progress, with free elections and a modern constitution." However, the country has subsequently had nine governments, none of which were able to tackle the country's growing economic problems.

Labor strikes took place in 2012.

Protests
The protests began in response to a new law that took effect on January 1, and raised taxes on gasoline, phone cards, housing, internet usage, hotel rooms and foods such as fruits and vegetables. Import duties on cosmetics and some agricultural products were also raised.

Opposition leader Hamma Hammami stated that several opposition parties would meet in order to coordinate their efforts on Tuesday, January 9. The opposition then called for a mass protest to be held in the capital city of Tunis on 14 January to mark the seventh anniversary of the Arab Spring uprising which toppled President Zine El Abidine Ben Ali.

On 8 January a Jewish school on the Tunisian island of Djerba was firebombed, while there were no protests on the island, locals reported the assailants had exploited the fact that there was lower security presence as police were elsewhere dealing with the protestors.

By the evening of 10 January over 2100 troops had been deployed to "protect sovereign institutions and vital facilities” such as "banks, post offices and other government buildings in the country's main cities" according to Defense Ministry spokesman Belhassen al-Waslati.

On January 11, witnesses said that Tunisian protesters "burned down a regional national security headquarters near the Algerian border" as the government deployed security forces and said it will "not revise austerity measures in the 2018 budget."

Late-2018 protests
Mass protests erupted, mostly by public sector workers, against the regime and its failure to keep the economy thriving in November 2018. Anti-government protests swelled from workers into a broader movement. The movement became popular within the nation. Workers demanded an end to police brutality, poverty and unemployment. University students protested with the workers demanding free education and better wages. Police tried to disperse the stone-throwers by tear gas and rubber bullets but police officials stopped using force and soon joined the demonstrations, demanding an end to the regime.

Casualties
It was confirmed in a statement by the Ministry of the Interior on 8 January that a man had been admitted to a Tebourba hospital with symptoms of dizziness and later died. His body had shown no signs of violence and a forensic doctor has been tasked with determining the man's cause of death. The government stated that the likely cause was due to inhalation of tear gas. Five others were injured in the demonstrations according to a report published by Tunis Afrique Presse.

Interior ministry spokesman Khelifa Chibani said about 50 policemen were wounded and 237 people were arrested on 9 January. This was echoed by BBC which said on January 10 that "more than 200 people have been arrested" across the country, and at least 49 police officers injured "during clashes with demonstrators." As of January 12, 778 people had been arrested by police in response to the protests.

On January 12, the Spokesperson for OHCHR, Rupert Colville, said the United Nations is closely "watching the demonstrations across Tunisia and the authorities’ response to them" concerned about the "high number of arrests" and asserted that "authorities must ensure that those exercising their rights to freedom of expression and peaceful assembly are not prevented from doing so." Mr. Colville added that "peaceful demonstrators must not be held responsible or penalised for the violent acts of others" and urged all "sides to work together towards resolving, with full respect for human rights, the economic and social problems underpinning the unrest."

Responses
The governments of Britain, Germany, Sweden, Norway and Belgium have warned "their citizens about potential rioting" while Turkish President Recep Tayyip Erdoğan spoke with Tunisian leaders about the protests, saying he believed that when the country "stands united" Tunisia would "overcome its problems." The embassy of the United States in the country put out a statement as well, reminding U.S. citizens "residing in and visiting Tunisia to exercise caution, avoid demonstrations and crowds, and monitor local media for breaking events."

Ennahdha, a party in the governing coalition of Tunisia condemned the "exploitation of citizens' legitimate demands by certain anarchist groups" and stressed "the legitimacy of demands for development and employment and citizens' full right to peaceful protest without violating the safety of others or attacking private and public property" while the opposition alliance, Popular Front, called for "all Tunisian people [to] go out to the streets for a peaceful protests country wide for one clear goal, which is to bring down these actions that destroyed the Tunisian country and its people." The Prime Minister of Tunisia also condemned the "vandalism" of protesters and claimed that while the country is "having difficulties...we believe that 2018 will be the last difficult year for the Tunisians."

The Trotskyist WSWS, a website supportive of the protests, argued that in Tunisia, like Egypt, elements of the old regime "managed to reconsolidate power in the interests of the native ruling elites and international capital," further saying that the reforms imposed by the government are pushed to "meet the conditions demanded by the International Monetary Fund and the European Union." Other supportive websites said that these "brave Tunisians...[are] courageous people rebelling long into the night [who] will continue on with or without our support."

See also

Tunisian bread riots
Tunisian Revolution
2013–2014 Tunisian political crisis
2016 Tunisian protests

References

2018 in Tunisia
Tunisian protests
Arab Winter in Tunisia
January 2018 events in Africa
February 2018 events in Africa
Protests in Tunisia
2018–2022 Arab protests